The rufous-winged sunbird (Cinnyris rufipennis) is a species of bird in the family Nectariniidae.
It is endemic to Tanzania.

Its natural habitat is subtropical or tropical moist montane forests.
It is threatened by habitat loss.

References

External links
BirdLife Species Factsheet.

rufous-winged sunbird
Endemic birds of Tanzania
rufous-winged sunbird
Taxonomy articles created by Polbot